Brumlow Top is a mountain on the Barrington Tops plateau, in the Mid-Coast Council in New South Wales, Australia.

The surrounding area is covered by sub alpine Snow Gum woodland and high altitude swamps and is contained with the Barrington Tops National Park.

See also

 List of mountains of New South Wales

References 

Mid-Coast Council
Mountains of New South Wales